The Bayfront Convention Center is a convention center complex located in Erie, Pennsylvania. The center, which has views of Presque Isle Bay from three sides, includes a  Great Hall with a seating capacity of 4,500, and a  Grand Ballroom. The attached hotels are a Sheraton and Courtyard by Marriott
The center held an open house beginning on August 3, 2007. Local promotion continued with public tours during the annual Celebrate Erie festival 17–19 August 2007. The attached hotel opened on April 10, 2008.

Construction manager, Barton Malow completed the construction of this project which won the 2008 Build America Award from the Associated General Contractors of America.

General Managers
 Kevin R. Molloy, June 3, 2002 – May 11, 2008
 Jeff Esposito, May 12, 2008 – present

References

External links
Bayfront Convention Center

Convention centers in Pennsylvania
Economy of Erie, Pennsylvania
Buildings and structures in Erie, Pennsylvania
Municipal authorities in Pennsylvania
Tourist attractions in Erie, Pennsylvania